PHPA may refer to:

 Professional Hockey Players' Association
 Port Hedland Port Authority